Johnson Electric (德昌電機控股有限公司) is a provider of motors, actuators, motion subsystems and related electro-mechanical components for automotive, industrial and medical applications. Johnson Electric has manufacturing facilities in 22 countries.

For the 12 months ending 31 March 2022, the company's net income was US$146 million on revenues of US$3.45billion.

The company's motion systems, motors and switches businesses are managed through two operating divisions: the Automotive Products Group and the Industry Products Group. Supporting the two divisions is the Group's Component & Services (C&S) function which produces plastic and metal parts, tooling and production equipment for motor and motion-related products.

Johnson Electric has its head office in Shatin, Hong Kong, and is listed on the Hong Kong stock exchange. Johnson Electric has over 35,000 employees and subcontract workers in more than 22 countries, with the majority of the workforce engaged in production activities in China. Engineering centers are located in Canada, China, France, Germany, Hong Kong, Hungary, Italy, Israel, Switzerland, the UK and the USA.

Automotive Products Group
The Automotive Products Group ("APG") provides powder metal components, custom motors, actuators, switches and motion sub-system solutions for automotive motion related functions. Customers include Valeo, Mahle, Magna, Ford, Volkswagen and General Motors.

The APG product line comprises the following brands and products:
 Saia-Burgess for custom actuators and switches;
 GATE for engine cooling fan modules;
 Johnson Motor for DC motors (Standard DC, Compact DC, and brushless DC product lines);
 Stackpole for powder metal components and pumps;
 AML for active modules for vehicle headlamp systems.

The Automotive Products Group is focused to support the major automotive segments of powertrain, body and chassis. 
Motion solutions are available in the following areas: 
 Exterior Segment which includes motion solutions for headlamp adjusters, mirror adjusters, washer pumps, headlamp washers, front and rear window wipers
 Door and Closure Segment which includes Motion solutions for cinching latches, door locks, door closure assistant, windowlift systems, convertible top systems, sunroof control
 Interior Segment includes Motion solutions for seat adjusters, pedal adjusters, lumbar support adjusters, headrest adjusters
 Tire and Braking Segment includes Motion solutions for anti-lock brake systems, electric parking brake, 4WD transfer case and air pump
 Powertrain Engine Management Segment includes Motion solutions for electronic throttle control, traction control, suction-pipe actuators
 Heating and Cooling Segment includes cooling fan modules, climate control, electronic speed controllers, HVAC blowers
 Steering, Suspension and Safety Segments include Motion solutions for steering wheel locks, suspension levelling, vehicle stability control systems

Industry Products Group
The Industry Products Group ("IPG") provides motion products and customized solutions for various commercial and industrial applications, including smart metering, circuit breakers, home appliances, power tools, business equipment, personal care products, building automation, security and other industrial products.
Key customers include Dyson, Electrolux, Johnson & Johnson, Husqvarna and Landis+Gyr.

The IPG product line comprises the following brands and products:
 Johnson Motor for DC motors (Standard DC, Compact DC, and brushless DC product lines), and AC motors;
 Saia Motor for stepper motors and synchronous motors;
 Nanomotion for piezo motion systems;
 Parlex for flexible circuits and microelectronics; 
 Ledex for solenoids;
 Saia, Burgess, Ledex for switches and relays;
 Johnson Medtech for medication delivery and surgical devices, medical grade pumps and custom actuators.

The Industry Products Group serves the following major segments:
 White goods such as dishwasher, dryer, freezer, refrigerator, washing machine
 Heating, ventilation and air conditioning such as fans, range hoods, heater, air purifier, air humidifier, boilers, water heaters
 Floor care such as vacuum cleaner, power brush, floor polisher, steam cleaners, stick vac, hand vacuum
 Home appliances such as blender, coffee machine, deep fryer, food processor, juicer, mixer, sewing machine, electric knife, slicer, mini chopper, stick blender, hand mixer, stand mixer
 Power and garden tools such as robotic mower, drills, screwdrivers, leaf blower, rotary tool, belt sander, hedge trimmer, circular saw, reciprocal saw, angle drill, string trimmer, impact driver
 Small engine electric starters for lawn and garden, outboard marine, ATV, jet ski, golf cart, snowmobile
 Personal care such as toothbrush, hair dryer, hair trimmer, massager, hair clipper, foot bath, spa
 Business machines such as ATMs, Point of Sale, vending machines, printers, currency handling
 Building automation such as electric meters, gas meters, circuit breakers, door locks, window closures
 Healthcare and medical equipment such as blood pressure monitors, nebulizers, dental jets, lab equipment, electric beds and other mobility aids
 Industrial equipment such as semiconductor automation, document sorting and material handling.

Company history
The company was founded in 1959.

In 2000 the Johnson Electric Chairman Patrick Wang was named the DHL International (HK)/South China Morning Post Businessman of the Year.

In 2004 the company acquired Nihon Mini Motor for camera and optical disc drive products. In 2005 the company acquired Parlex, a USA manufacturer of flexible printed circuits.

In 2012 the company divested Saia Burgess Controls Division.

In 2015 the company acquired Stackpole, a manufacturer of engine and transmission pumps and powder metal components. In 2016 the company acquired AML Systems, a supplier of active modules for vehicle headlamp systems.

In 2016 Johnson Electric was named as among the best companies to work for in Asia by HR Asia Magazine.

In October, 2022, Johnson Electric acquired the Zwickau-headquartered eBike drive system company, Pendix.

Recent Events
2017: Agreed to increase its equity interest in Halla Stackpole Corp. from 30% to 80% for approx. US$84 million 
2017: Opened new production plant in Arujá, Brazil

References

Companies listed on the Hong Kong Stock Exchange
Electronics companies of Hong Kong
Engineering companies of Hong Kong
Former companies in the Hang Seng Index